Maeve Ellen O'Donovan is a singer-songwriter from Limerick, Ireland. She was a finalist in the 2006/2007 final on the RTÉ programme You're a Star. She made it to the semi-final. In the final week of the competition, her track, "Landslide", made it into the Irish music charts.

The Irish Rugby Team (coached by her father Niall O'Donovan) pledged their support for her to win the "You're A Star" competition in which she came in third.

In 2014 she opened a coffeehouse in Limerick, Ireland, called 'Cellar Door'.

References

External links
 

Living people
1990 births
People from County Clare
You're a Star contestants
21st-century Irish singers
21st-century Irish women singers